Kevin John Parsons (born 2 May 1973) is a former English cricketer who played one-day cricket for Somerset County Cricket Club between 1992 and 2002. He appeared three times for Somerset in List A cricket, and five times for Somerset Cricket Board, for whom he scored his highest total, hitting 65 as captain against Bedfordshire in 1999. His twin brother, Keith Parsons also played for Somerset.

References

1973 births
Living people
English cricketers
Sportspeople from Taunton
Somerset cricketers
Somerset Cricket Board cricketers
Wiltshire cricketers
Twin sportspeople
English twins